Mahmoud Beiglou (born 1929) is an Iranian alpine skier. He competed in three events at the 1956 Winter Olympics.

References

1929 births
Living people
Iranian male alpine skiers
Olympic alpine skiers of Iran
Alpine skiers at the 1956 Winter Olympics
Place of birth missing (living people)